Space division may refer to:

 9th Space Division
 General Electric Space Division
 Space and Missile Systems Center
 literally a division of space, as in case of Space-division multiple access